Florence Patricia Devries (6 July 1930 - date of death unknown) was a British figure skater. She competed in the ladies' singles event at the 1952 Winter Olympics.

In 1953, she married three times world champion speedway rider Freddie Williams.

References

External links
 

1930 births
British female single skaters
Olympic figure skaters of Great Britain
Figure skaters at the 1952 Winter Olympics
Sportspeople from Blackpool